Aubrey James Charleston (22 November 1901 – 5 August 1985) was an Australian rules footballer who played for the Carlton Football Club and Essendon Football Club in the Victorian Football League (VFL).

Notes

External links 

Aub Charleston's profile at Blueseum

1901 births
Carlton Football Club players
Essendon Football Club players
Ulverstone Football Club players
Australian rules footballers from Tasmania
1985 deaths
Coburg Football Club players